Carlo Montemagno (August 7, 1956 – October 11, 2018) was an American engineer and expert in nanotechnology and biomedical engineering, focusing on futuristic technologies to create interdisciplinary solutions for the grand challenges in health, energy and the environment. He has been considered one of the pioneers of bionanotechnology. Some of his fundamental contributions include the development of biomolecular motors for powering inorganic nanodevices while at Cornell and muscle-driven self-assembled nanodevices while at UCLA.

Academic career 

Montemagno received his bachelor's degree in Agricultural and Biological Engineering from Cornell University in New York, his master's degree in Petroleum and Natural Gas Engineering from Pennsylvania State University, and his doctoral degree in Civil Engineering and Geological Sciences from the University of Notre Dame in Indiana.

Montemagno died in office while serving as the Chancellor of Southern Illinois University Carbondale. Right before moving to SIU, he directed the interdisciplinary Ingenuity Lab at the University of Alberta in Edmonton, Canada. He also served as the Director of the Biomaterials Program for the Canadian Research Council's National Institute for Nanotechnology as well as a Strategic Research Chair in Intelligent Nanosystems for the National Research Council. Before joining the University of Alberta, he was the Founding Dean of the College of Engineering and Applied Sciences at the University of Cincinnati.

His previous academic appointments include being the Founding Chair of the Department of Bioengineering and Biomedical Engineering, Co-Director of the NASA Center for Cell Mimetic Space Exploration, and Associate Director of the California Nanosystems Institute at the University of California, Los Angeles, the Director of the Biomedical Engineering Graduate Program at Cornell University and the Group Leader in Environmental Physics at the Argonne National Laboratory in Chicago. He also served in the U. S. Navy Civil Engineer Corps for nine years, leaving with the rank of lieutenant.

Awards and honors 

Throughout his career, Montemagno received many awards for his scientific innovations, including the Feynman Prize in Nanotechnology (for creating single molecule biological motors with nano-scale silicon devices), the Earth Award Grand Prize (for cell-free artificial photosynthesis with over 95% efficiency) and the CNBC Business Top 10 Green Innovators award (for Aquaporin Membrane water purification and desalination technology). He was named a Bill & Melinda Gates Grand Challenge Winner for his development of an oral vaccine delivery system that increased vaccine stability. He was a Fellow for the American Institute for Medical and Biomedical Engineering, the American Academy for Nanomedicine and the NASA Institute for Advanced Concepts.

Personal life 

Carlo Montemagno was born in 1956 to Gasper Patrick and Jacqueline Ann (Graham) Montemagno in Bronx, NY. He married Pamela Ann LaCava in 1976, and they remained married until his death. He was an avid reader and collector of books and an aerobatic and commercial pilot. He also enjoyed dog sports, falconry, ice climbing, science fiction, war movies and disco. Montemagno died in 2018 in St. Louis due to complications arising from cancer.

References

External links
Obituary at meredithfh.com

Penn State College of Engineering alumni
Cornell University College of Engineering faculty
American expatriates in Canada
American people of Italian descent
University of California, Los Angeles faculty
American expatriate academics
American bioengineers
American chemical engineers
1956 births
2018 deaths
Cornell University alumni
Academic staff of the University of Alberta
20th-century American engineers
Fellows of the American Institute for Medical and Biological Engineering
University of Notre Dame alumni
Southern Illinois University Carbondale faculty
21st-century American engineers
University of Cincinnati faculty
Argonne National Laboratory people
Scientists from the Bronx